Hyewon pungsokdo is an album of the genre paintings (pungsokhwa or pungsokdo) drawn by the Korean painter Shin Yunbok during the late Joseon dynasty. It was named after Shin's pen name, Hyewon, and comprises 30 paintings in total.

In 1930, Jeon Hyeopil (전형필:全鎣弼), later the founder of the Gansong Art Museum, purchased it from an antique dealer in Osaka, Japan and newly mounted the album. Oh Sechang (오세창), who was a journalist and pro-independence activist, wrote the subtitles and postface for the album. Hyewon pungsokdo is designated as the 135th National Treasure of South Korea and is held in the collection of the Gansong Art Museum located in Seongbuk-gu, Seoul, South Korea.

Gallery

Entertainment (7)

Gibang (5)

Daily life (6)

Meeting (5)

Lovers (5)

Lust (2)

See also
Danwon pungsokdo cheop
Korean painting
List of Korean painters
Geumgangjeondo
Inwangjesaekdo

External links
  Brief information about Hyewon pungsokdo from 한국학연구소
  Brief information about Hyewon pungsokdo  from Yahoo Korea dictionary
  옛사람들의 생활모습 from 문화재청
  Brief information about Hyewon pungsokdo from Encyber dictionary

Joseon dynasty
Korean painting
National Treasures of South Korea